Tanja von Lahnstein (née Wittkamp, formerly von Anstetten) is a fictional character from the German soap opera Verbotene Liebe (Forbidden Love), played by actress Miriam Lahnstein. She made her first appearance on-screen on 21 June 1995 and left after three years in May 1998. Lahnstein returned to the role in 2001, where she was seen from 24 April to 5 October. She came back another three years later and reappeared on 16 April 2004. Lahnstein left the show for a short time, while being on contract, from June 2005 to March 2006 and from March to December 2007 during the pregnancy of her two children. She left again in December 2009 and returned in April 2010. She played the character till the series cancelation in 2015.

In 2020, Lahnstein was rumored to appear in the TVNOW revival Verbotene Liebe - Next Generation, but wasn't confirmed till January 2021. She appeared in the ninth and tenth episode of the first season.

Creation

Introduction
Only months after the show started, then 21-year-old Miriam Lahnstein was cast in the role of Tanja Wittkamp. A blonde beauty, who comes home from boarding school to see that her parents are broke and have to sell their stud farm. Aristocrat Christoph von Anstetten buys most of the horses, one of them Tanja's favorite. Jan Brandner sees the young woman crying over her lost and gets Christoph to promise that Tanja is always welcome to Castle Friedenau to visit her horse. For Tanja the ticket in a new world, where money rules and you can have a lot of influence. It doesn't take Tanja long to show her true colors, starting schemes and love affairs out of calculation and her own interest.

Over the years
In the beginning, Tanja starts off with little schemes and using people to get what she wants. That sort of changes, when Tanja murders her second husband and former stepson Rajan Rai to get the fortune of her first husband Ben von Anstetten. With her first murder committed it seemed that the end of Tanja is near. The soap villain murders two other characters, Cleo Winter and Tim Sander, before leaving the show. Tanja returns three years later to make several attempts to murder again – but without a success. After a plane crash, Tanja seems to be dead, but shows up three years later, in 2004, very much alive.
Without further explanation it is mentioned that Donald Rush, who Tanja works for, cleared her criminal record and the authorities have no evidence whatsoever against Tanja, in spite of a few witnesses from her past being still alive. Tanja murders again in her first year back, putting the blame on one of the murders on Bernd von Beyenbach. Even though Bernd has an alibi, Tanja is never connected to the murder. Miriam Lahnstein then had to leave the show due to her first pregnancy, which led to making the character of Tanja pregnant as well.
Actress and character return to the show nine months later with Tanja in a convent. She tries to maintain the pretense that she had changed, but it doesn't take long before she returns to her old self. But now with the character having a little son, Tanja is depicted as being less extreme and is not involved in any subsequent murders; the executives wanted to bring out the human aspect of her character and present her as both mother and villain. One year after her return, Miriam Lahnstein was expecting her second child which led to her leaving the show once more. This time without an on-screen pregnancy. Instead Tanja kidnapped her son and then faked her own death with the help of Adrian Degenhardt.
In the following months Adrian had several telephone conversations with Tanja. A few of them with Miriam Lahnstein's voice. Tanja returned from the dead in December 2007 and is arrested for the first time for faking her death and kidnapping her son. But Tanja blackmails Ansgar von Lahnstein, the child's father, and gets off with only a suspended sentence.
In fall 2008, TPTB wanted to show the human side of Tanja once again and opened up about Tanja's childhood with the presence of her mother. The result was an explanation that Tanja had to undergo psychiatric care for two years, after her father blamed her for the death of her younger brother, Thomas. The storyline received varied feedback from viewers. Some argued the show should stop trying to portray Tanja more humanely, while others welcomed the added dimension to the character. The critique of one-dimensionality has been oft fought by the character and seems to have been the justification for showing Tanja as a mother and a woman with a tragic past. One year after Tanja's past was revisited, the writers struck a balance that allowed them to use both sides of the character. She is now portrayed as a mother and a woman with a troubled past, knows how to use her sex-appeal to her advantage, is cunning and should not be crossed because she will do anything, even kill, to get what she wants. At the start of 2011, Tanja is shown to be vulnerable, when she develops feelings for Sebastian von Lahnstein. Tanja seems to be honest towards him and lets him know why she seems so messed up. To Sebastian, Tanja even admits that she doesn't want her kids to be anything like her.

Personality
Tanja starts off as a shy young woman who has just lost her favorite horse after her parents declare bankruptcy. But she soon begins to show her true self. She is manipulative and unhindered in securing her best interest. With her natural beauty, Tanja has the men in her corner and can use them at will to carry out her grand schemes. Tanja idolizes the life of the rich and famous. To attain her ideal life – one in which she has a high public profile without any concern over money, she marries into the aristocratic Anstetten family and later into the von Lahnstein family. When Tanja returns as a mother in 2006, her priorities have changed. She puts her son first wanting him to have everything she had always wanted for herself and is ready to do everything in her power to ensure just that. Tanja's vulnerable side is shown in the story about her childhood, when she had similar protection for brother as she has now for her son and had to deal with her mother's alcoholism, an issue shortly visited in 1996. In 2011, Tanja talks to Sebastian about her troubled childhood, saying that she has to either fight or drown. Sebastian might be actually the first man Tanja every really loved. He also eventually becomes the first man to whom Tanja ever confessed her murder of Tim Sander.

Story lines

Tanja's arrival
As a destitute woman Tanja arrives in Düsseldorf and begins to work for the Anstetten family. Soon, she has affairs with Henning von Anstetten and Jan Brandner. She pretends to be pregnant with Henning's child and wants to marry him, but his stepmother Clarissa von Anstetten opposes this and finds out that Tanja was lying.

Tanja disappears but soon comes back as the wife of Christoph von Anstetten's hated brother, Benedikt. Tanja hasn't married Benedikt out of love, but only to get revenge on the Anstetten family. Benedikt finds out, admits that he didn't marry her out of love either. Tanja and Ben decide to fight her war against the family together. When a mysterious man named Rajan Rai begins to work on Friedenau Castle, Tanja finds out, that he is Ben's illegitimate child. When Ben dies of poison, it is not Tanja who inherits his money, but Rajan. Tanja begins an affair with Tim Sander and realizes that Rajan is jealous. She makes Rajan believe, that they could have a future together. Both leave Düsseldorf and get married in India. After the marriage, Tanja kills Rajan and gets all his money. Back in Düsseldorf, Tanja meddles in the relationship between her former lover Tim and Cleo Winter, causing Cleo to breaks up with Tim.

Tanja now wants to destroy her enemy Clarissa and kidnaps her. She tries to obtain full power of the empire of Clarissa's best friend Charlie Schneider. Clarissa escapes but she tumbles and suffers from amnesia. Tanja manages to take Clarissa's possession but Clarissa regains her memory and swears revenge. Cleo begins to dig into in Tanja's past but is murdered by her. Clarissa gets her revenge and regains her possessions. Tanja hits rock bottom and leaves Düsseldorf. Clarissa isn't satisfied and wants to see Tanja dead. She tells Tim that Tanja killed Cleo, prompting him to pursue Tanja to Portugal, where he locks her up in a cellar.

She's back in town!
2001: After three years, Clarissa gets news that Tim was found dead. It seems like he committed suicide as the police in Portugal find him with his wrists slit. Charlie and Clarissa realize that Tim died the same way Cleo did and fear the return of Tanja. Clarissa hires a private investigator and bodyguard Mark Roloff for her own safety. As news arrives that nothing about Tanja has been found in Portugal, Clarissa is relieved and is starting to believe that Tim had murdered Tanja years ago. Neither Charlie nor Clarissa know that Tanja is already back in Düsseldorf. When Marie von Beyenbach, the fiancé of Henning, is attacked by a stranger, Tanja hurries to her rescue but hides before Henning can see her. Clarissa is happy that nothing happened to her goddaughter and is determined to help Marie in finding her mysterious rescuer. Meanwhile, Tanja's plan begins to work and she was the one organizing the attack in the first place. As Marie seems to give up hope to ever see her white knight again, Tanja only waits for a chance to run into Marie. Happy to see Tanja again, Marie wants to throw a party as a thank you. Tanja appears modest, but can't wait to have her big entrance and look at the faces of Clarissa and Henning. They are really shocked as Marie is surprised by their reaction and wants to know what's going on. Tanja confesses that she once tried to make a play for the Anstetten family and was married to Henning's uncle. Marie doesn't know what to think, while Tanja visits Clarissa and promises her to destroy her once and for all this time around. She also makes no secret out of her plan of using Marie to succeed with her plan. Clarissa tries to convince Tanja that it's just about the two of them and wants to leave Marie out of it. Tanja accepts Clarissa's offer as a disguise, when she arranges that Marie walks in on them as Clarissa wants to pay Tanja off to stay away from Marie. Clarissa tells Marie the truth about all of Tanja's crimes, but Marie doesn't believe her anymore. She goes to see Charlie to get the truth as Charlie is desperate to expose Tanja as the criminal she is. But when Henning, who wasn't in town for most of Tanja's actions, and Marie want to talk to Charlie, she has to lie as Tanja is about to poison her nephew Oliver Sabel. Clarissa is shocked by Charlie's lie and is later told that Oliver's life is at risk and that Clarissa has to do without Charlie. In the meanwhile, Tanja gives Henning and Marie an explanation for Clarissa's reaction. Due to contracts, Tanja tells them that Clarissa can't put up with another Countess of Anstetten and lets it appear as she knows a secret about Clarissa. As Henning and Marie plan their wedding, Tanja's plan is coming to full circle as she fakes a DNA test that apparently proves that Marie and Henning share with Martin von Beyenbach the same father. Marie and Henning are shocked and have to forbid each other the love they are feeling. Tanja uses her own created situation to comfort Henning in his grief over losing the love of his life. Henning is ready to believe that Tanja changed over the years and the two starts to grow closer. But Henning comes behind the truth as Tanja is ready to marry him. He and Clarissa realize that Tanja plans to kill Henning right after the wedding to play a grieving widow with the Anstetten fortune. Together with Beatrice von Beyenbach, Clarissa wants to bring Tanja down. Henning agrees to marry Tanja as a plan to let it appear as if her plan works. Marie, who doesn't know any of it, tries to stop Henning from marrying Tanja as he exchanges with his bride the "I dos". Henning later receives a letter, apparently from Marie to meet at a private place. Henning takes the invitation and is confronted with Tanja, disguised as Clarissa. As Tanja is watched by some of the wedding guests, she shoots Henning. Soon after that, Tanja gets the news, that Henning died in hospital. Clarissa seems to be wanted for Henning's death as Tanja gives a special performance as grieving widow. After Henning's will is read and Tanja gets less than expected, the funeral is about to come, where a very much alive Henning appears and Tanja gets arrested. Clarissa finally seems to win the battle and even gives a big celebration party. After all the trouble Tanja made for the past few months, Clarissa plans a vacation to the Bahamas as Tanja can break out of police custody. She first takes Beatrice and her lover Lukas Roloff hostage and then leaves them to die in a gas eruption. While Beatrice and Lukas are rescued, Tanja appears in Clarissa's private jet. She wants a high payment of ransom for Clarissa's life as Henning isn't sure that Tanja is ever going to let Clarissa leave. In a moment of inattention, Clarissa can get Tanja's gun as the pilot Volker announces they have a storm coming towards them. Soon later the news breaks into Henning and Martin that the Plane crashed over Brazil. Clarissa, Tanja and the Pilot Volker are presumed death.

New, old life!
Three years later, in 2004, a shocking truth comes out: Tanja is alive and back in Düsseldorf. With help from her new boss Donald Rush, Tanja can prove her innocence of all the crimes she committed in the past. As an assistant of Mr. Rush, she meets Ansgar von Lahnstein to do business in a new center in Düsseldorf. For that, Tanja smuggles counterfeit money into the country. Ansgar is fascinated by the mysterious Tanja and begins an affair with her. But in this relationship, there is only one thing that matters – money and power. Tanja realizes that Ansgar isn't like the men she had before and is impressed.
Tanja spends her old "friend" Charlie Schneider a visit. Charlie is shocked, when she realizes that Tanja is alive and calls the police. But they can't do anything and Charlie has to bare, how Tanja plays with David McNeil, Charlie's boyfriend. He begins an affair with her, but Charlie finds out soon and breaks up with David. He realizes that Tanja only used him to get back at Charlie and he turns his back on Tanja.

The Truth about Tanja's past
Tanja gets the shock of her life when her mother Annegret arrives soon before she marries Ansgar in Summer 2008. Annegret wants a reconciliation after the haven't spoken for years. But Tanja refuses to let her mother back in her life, after all what happened between them. Soon Ansgar and his ex-wife Nathalie Käppler get suspicious about Tanja's relationship with her mother and want to find out what really happened between back then. Ansgar finds a big lead, when he is asking after Tanja's younger brother Thomas, who died under mysterious circumstance with young eight years. Ansgar believes that Tanja might have something to do with the death of her brother and wants to use Annegret for that. But the old lady refuses to help him and tries to find her way back in Tanja's life. But Tanja can't forgive her mother and rejects her again and again. Annegret, an alcoholic, starts drinking again after a fight with her daughter. Ansgar finds her and finally sees his chance to find out what really happened. But Tanja can rescue herself and takes "care" of her mother. She employs the former jail-keeper Ulla Müller to hold her mother as a hostage and give her pills, so she couldn't remember anything and would go crazy with time. 
However, when Tanja is out of town, Ansgar and Nathalie try to find Annegret. After some misleads, they do and get locked-up by Ulla Müller too. But the police is already informed and can rescue them and Annegret's life. When Annegret is getting better and comes back to Castle Königsbrunn, Ansgar is sure that she is ready to tell the truth about Tanja, the kidnapping and about what happened to her brother Thomas. But when the police is already there, Annegret refuses to turn Tanja in and takes side with her daughter once again. But then finally, Annegret wants to open up to the entire Lahnstein family, but it's not what Ansgar hoped for. Annegret begins to tell what really happened in Tanja's childhood. She tells them about the beats from her own father and how her younger brother Thomas tried to protect Tanja. But he fell down the stairs after his father pushed him, when he tried again to look out for his older sister. Thomas died right after the fall. Tanja's father took the blame on her. Annegret didn't stud up for her daughter and both made Tanja responsible for Thomas death. After that Tanja was in a psychiatric institution for two years. When Annegret tells that in front of the entire Lahnstein family, she also begs for Tanja's forgiveness, when Tanja breaks down in tears. Annegret wants to repair their relationship, but Tanja tells her mother once and for all that she won't forgive her. She is surprised when Annegret agrees to leave Düsseldorf for good, seeing that she can't win the love of her daughter back. But on the way to the airport, Annegret starts one last attempt to come clean with her daughter, even threaten Tanja to commit suicide. Tanja doesn't believe her, believing that her mother wouldn't have guts to end her life. Annegret wants to prove her daughter wrong and jumps into a river. An unidentified body is found days later, when Tanja already decided to shut off her past.

Ally with Ansgar
Tanja works long and hard to get Nathalie out of Ansgar's life, but in the end she is successful and Ansgar decided to become an ally to Tanja. he marries her and so she became a von Lahnstein. He doesn't want to see his sister Carla running the family business, the Lahnstein Holding, any longer. Tanja and Ansgar plan to set Carla up for arms trading. This way they could force her to write them over the Holding. But with missing contacts, the devilish duo have to make Adrian Degenhardt, an enemy of Ansgar's, to a business partner who helps them out with his contacts in Singapore. While Tanja and Ansgar make the first steps with their plan, Carla and her stepmother Elisabeth already know that they plan something to get Carla out of the holding. Elisabeth then decided to take a chance and gets Adrian to work for them as an informer. He tells Elisabeth and Carla about any information he can get, but it isn't enough until Tanja and Ansgar find out that Adrian is a rat. While Tanja tries to do the business in Singapore herself, Ansgar threatens Adrian with his life; leading for him to leave town. After that Ansgar leaves town for a while too and he returns short time after Tanja with the sureness to have success with their scheme. With the arms trading as an open secret of Tanja and Ansgar's plan, Ansgar wants to give his sister a chance to handle to Holding over to him without a scandal. But Carla shows strength and would rather go to prison as see Ansgar at the head of their father's legacy. Tanja and Ansgar go through with their plan and Carla gets arrested in front of the entire press. Ansgar believes that Carla still will come to her senses and give him the Holding. When Elisabeth and the rest of the family already think that they lost and Sebastian gets Carla to write the Holding over to Ansgar, they realize that something went wrong with Tanja and Ansgar's plan after Tanja makes a surprise visit in jail with a new – lower – offer for Carla. Ansgar finds out that the arms were just play guns and Carla would be free as soon as the authorities find out. But their play on time gets uglier by any minute when Ansgar is threaten by a business partner who was waiting for real guns and instead got plastic one's. He wants his money back that he lost in this deal and threatens Ansgar with his life. Tanja helps her husband out and lends him the money, but Elisabeth and Sebastian play Ansgar, switch the beg with the money and blackmail him afterwards. They offer him the money when he makes sure that Carla comes free. Ansgar can't believe that he lost and doesn't want to make a deal. While Sebastian made sure that Ansgar's business partner already got the money, Tanja thinks that Hannes' life could be in danger and Ansgar signs on to Sebastian and Elisabeth's blackmail. He pays Carla a visit in prison with the realization that he lost. Tanja and Ansgar have to start from the beginning to get control over the Lahnstein Holding, when Maria Galdi turns out to be Ansgar's supposedly dead mother Francesca. Tanja realizes that this could play in their hands and if Francesca is really alive the control over the family business could turn to Ansgar's favor – since he always was Francesca's favorite child. To be sure, Tanja takes a look at the DNA test that was done by Carla, who wanted to expose Maria as an impostor. And she was right. Maria isn't Francesca, but her younger sister Maria di Balbi. The family kept her a secret after a liaison Maria had with Johannes, while he already was engaged to Francesca. When Maria went crazy after Johannes married Francesca, she was locked up in a psychiatric facility and the newer generation never heard of her. Tanja and Ansgar want to use that and leaving Maria no choice as to play along as Francesca in front of the family and giving Ansgar the control of the Holding.

The Maria factor
With Maria posing as Francesca and giving Ansgar the control, Tanja hopes to get her part of the cake and wants an executive position at the Lahnstein Holding. But Ansgar is laughing in her face and telling her that he won't keep his part of the deal after all. Tanja is outraged and tries to threaten Ansgar to kill him. But he records their conversation and takes the tape to a lawyer, who would give it to the police if anything happens to him. Tanja is sick of Ansgar's game and ready to a wife in grief. She hires a someone to break into the lawyer's office and get her the tape, so that she can let Ansgar end up dead. But her plan goes wrong from the beginning when she is expecting someone in the NoLimits and mistakes Ansgar's cousin Tristan von Lahnstein for the assistance. Tristan doesn't hear enough of the plan to make trouble for Tanja instead the two end up in bed together. After that Tanja gives her plan another try and gets her hands on the tape that keeps Ansgar's life save. But she has to find out that Maria got to the informant faster and Tanja is only left with a manipulated copy. Maria and Ansgar celebrate her battle win over Tanja, but the war isn't finished yet. With Maria and Ansgar as allies, Tanja is dangerous than ever before threatening Maria's life or to expose the secret that she isn't really Francesca to the other family members. Ansgar has to play nice with Tanja again. But to show Tanja her own breaking point, Maria and he lock her up in a small room, causing a panic attack. She tries to escape the room and falls; lying unconscious on the ground. Tanja is later found and remembers very well what happened to her. Waiting for her next battle to come, she discovers that Maria can't keep up with the lie and is about to expose herself. Since Maria fulfilled her job, Tanja doesn't see a reason to keep her alive and not let "Francesca" die again. Ansgar isn't her biggest fan for long either, since she always tries to act towards Carla as a mother and even though he isn't part of Tanja's plan to murder Maria, he does know what's about to happen. Dealing with facing that Maria most likely will end up dead, Ansgar finds out that Maria is in fact his biological mother. Her baby, believing it died, was taken away from her when she stayed at a mental hospital and raised by Francesca and Johannes – that baby was no one other than Ansgar. Tanja is already to succeed to let Maria's death look like suicide when Ansgar finds his mother and tries to bring her back to life. He succeeds and sees what a huge treat his abhorred wife is. Together with Maria, he plans to drug Tanja constantly and try to bring her into a psychiatric hospital. Ansgar's plan works as Tanja gets more and more disorientated. Tanja's state brings her Elisabeth as an ally, who is worried about her former enemy. Tanja begins to trust Elisabeth and hopes that she can help her, leaving her with the truth that Maria isn't Francesca after all with admitting that she faked the DNA results. Elisabeth is testing the maternity between Ansgar and Maria and is shocked when the results come back positive – Maria is Ansgar's mother. Elisabeth thinks Tanja lied for whatever reason or is too confused after all to control reality from fiction. Tanja has to realize how serious her mental state is, when she hallucinates about her death baby brother Thomas. Meanwhile, Ansgar and Maria hope to be near the finish line, when Elisabeth admits that Tanja needs professional help. As Elisabeth is ready to give up on Tanja and get her committed, Tristan discovers that Tanja isn't crazy after all. Not innocent on her last trip, Tristan is protecting her from the mental hospital and Tanja finally sees what happened to her. She discovers with her own eyes that Maria and Ansgar have been drugging her for weeks, so that she is out of the way for good. Later Tanja tries to play her enemies, while taking Hannes away; assuming that she plans on fleeing again. A dramatic showdown with Ansgar and Maria follows, where Tanja admits that she knows everything. Ansgar tries to shut Tanja up by giving her an overdose. Before she passes out Tanja tells Ansgar that she took Hannes and he will never see him again, if something happens to her. Ansgar, now afraid for the life of his wife, takes care of her, while she is on drugs and hopes to find out Hannes' location as soon as possible. When Tanja wakes up she still is under a lot of influence of the hallucinogen and falls down the stairs, when Maria and Ansgar try to stop her. Tanja is rushed to the hospital, where she tells Elisabeth everything. She is blackmailing Ansgar into giving her half of the Lahnstein Holding and a confession on tape about his latest scheme against her, so that her life would be safe. In exchange for that, she would tell him where Hannes is. But before Ansgar agrees on Tanja's blackmail, her condition gets worst and she falls into a coma; not knowing if she ever will wake up again.

The Wake Up
After four months, Ansgar tries to become Tanja's guardian to dispose of her fortune. But then he gets a call from the hospital that Tanja finally opened her eyes again. Maria and Ansgar are afraid that now the truth is coming out about them poisoning Tanja. Maria is ready to leave the country with her son, when Ansgar finds out that Tanja suffers an amnesia and can't even remember her own child. Ansgar gives a performance as a loving husband and hopes to get her money after all. But when the news about Tanja waking up breaks through to Elisabeth, she is determined to show Tanja Ansgar's true colors. Tanja is confused whom to trust and refuses to give Ansgar her signature. She freaks out in front of him after she got conformation that she can't move her legs for a while. Ansgar pretends to have an understanding for her situation and tells her that he doesn't want to push her. Ansgar realizes that he needs to break Tanja's trust in Elisabeth first. He takes his wife home to Königsbrunn and ends up trying to frame his stepmother for the poisoning at the first chance he gets. When Tanja witnesses how much her son Hannes suffers because of her condition, she decides to put her trust in Ansgar and signs full power over to him. Her devious husband takes advantage of this to take all of Tanja's savings. Within weeks, Tanja gets her memory back and gets back to her old self. She decides to keep her state of health to herself and goes on perfectly playing her role as the powerless Tanja. In this time, Tanja learns to walk again and finds out about Ansgar's latest affair with his cousin's wife Lydia. She and Ansgar get suspicious that Tanja might have found out about them. Lydia is alarmed when she discovers that Tanja can walk again and knows about the affair. Tanja uses her knowledge to blackmail Ansgar to get back the money she stole from him. This way she would keep quiet. When Ansgar agrees to Tanja's terms, she is stunned that her husband seems to be in love with Lydia and wants to protect her. As Tanja mentions a deal with Ansgar, his uncle Ludwig fears that they are up to no good. Maria, who is in a relationship with Ludwig and feels threatened by Elisabeth, is determined to find out what Tanja and Ansgar are hiding to get closer to Ludwig and prove where her loyalty lies. When Maria discovers her son's affair with Lydia, she runs straight to Ludwig and tells him the truth. It doesn't take long for Ansgar and Lydia's affair to up in their faces.

Affair and sudden feelings with Sebastian
After Ansgar has fallen in love with his cousin's wife, Lydia, he finally wants to end his marriage with Tanja. Jealous and angry over Ansgar and Lydia's newfound happiness, Sebastian and Tanja start to sleep with each other. When Tanja finds out that Lydia is expecting a child, she fears that her son's heritage could be in danger. She even plans to make an attempt to the life of Lydia's unborn child, when she finds out that Sebastian could also be the father. As an early paternity test proves, the child is in fact Ansgar's and he finally plans to divorce Tanja, while Sebastian is filing for a divorce as well. Tanja now fears about her place in the family and tries to win in Sebastian a business partner with some extras. The two start an affair and soon appear as a new couple, much to the concern of the rest of the Lahnstein family. Feeling more comfortable in her new situation, she realizes that Sebastian would wish to be a father, after he couldn't be one to his daughter Christina. Tanja pretends to be pregnant with his child. As she plans to let her pregnancy become reality, Tristan comes behind her secret and tells Sebastian the truth. He throws Tanja out, but eventually has a change of heart. Tanja ends up being pregnant for real this time. She then gets news that after her divorce from Ansgar she would have to pay a sustenance to her soon-to-be ex-husband. That leads to Tanja's idea that she and Sebastian could get married. But he isn't interested and declines Tanja's offer. As the divorce proceedings arrive, Ansgar plans to get a lot of money out of Tanja. But Sebastian gets on Ansgar's level and finds out about his bank accounts in Switzerland. Sebastian blackmails him and Ansgar has to give up. Tanja is impressed with her divorce lawyer and starts to see Sebastian in another light. When Lydia comes behind Ansgar's schemes and breaks up with him, Sebastian thinks that he and his ex-wife maybe still have a chance. In an argument about Lydia, Sebastian pushes Tanja accidentally down the stairs. Sebastian fears that Tanja might have lost their child, but also questions his motives towards Tanja. In the meanwhile, Tanja has problems bonding with her unborn child. But to see how excited Hannes is about the sibling and hearing the baby's heartbeat for the first time gets to Tanja. Ansgar then tries to get rid of his former wife and informs Sebastian about a sexual adventure he and Tanja were supposed to have. Sebastian feels betrayed by Tanja and wants to throw her from the castle. Tanja genitally gives Sebastian a look in to her tortured soul and tells him that she might have her mistakes, but she would know by now that she never wants her children to become anything like her. Sebastian comforts Tanja and she sees that her feelings for Sebastian start to get more serious.

Crazy in love and Ligne Clarisse
Tanja becomes a powerful businesswoman as she and Sebastian become part of Lahnstein Enterprises. The team become a major shareholder, owning 50% of the company. Ludwig isn't pleased with Tanja's involvement, but needs her money when the company appears to be in a financial crisis. As Sebastian realizes that his father doesn't trust him, he and Tanja want to go after Ludwig's shares. Their plan falls apart when Ludwig is willing to found a board, where each family has one vote. Japanese businessman Sukimi Yakamoto offers Tanja to give her Castle Königsbrunn if she sells him her shares. Tanja is fighting with herself, but as she realizes that she can't betray Sebastian like this, Tanja turns Yakamoto's offer down. As news breaks that Marie von Anstetten has died and Ligne Clarisse is up for sale, Tanja makes the company of her former enemy Clarissa to the one condition to be on board with Ludwig's idea. Charlie is disgusted by Tanja's behavior, to humiliate Clarissa even after years of her death, but can't keep Ludwig from buying Ligne Clarisse for Tanja. In the meanwhile, Sebastian and Tanja have a hard time admitting their real feelings for each other. Sebastian's sister-in-law Marlene becomes a friend to Tanja and is advising her to give love a chance. But Tanja sees love as a weakness and isn't prepared to let down her shield. As Marlene can't get through to Tanja, she admits to Sebastian that Tanja has fallen in love with him. Sebastian convinces Marlene that he does feel the same, but later tells Tristan that he sees Tanja's love for him as a chance to control her. As he plans to propose to her, Tanja isn't giving in to his romantic gesture and Sebastian has to ask her again with a little trick, before she doesn't turn him down. Marlene is happy to see Tanja and Sebastian engaged, only to hear Tanja saying that she and Sebastian just work as a team and that they are working that way – nothing about love. Tanja's main focus shifts to Ligne Clarisse, where she allows Rebecca to work as junior designer for her. As Tanja is about to reactivate an old campaign, which themes the incestuous love of Jan and Julia, Rebecca is disgusted and tries to prevent Tanja from using the idea. She promises Tanja her designs if she forgets about using the twins. As Tanja laughs in Rebecca's face, she is determined to go up against Tanja. Rebecca calls in a board meeting in which she wants to discuss Tanja's idea for Ligne Clarisse. But Tanja is prepared and brings Rebecca to the center of attention, when she frames Rebecca for stolen designs. Rebecca is shocked and tells her family a different story. The Lahnsteins don't give in after Sebastian supports Tanja and Ligne Clarisse is going with the incest campaign. Rebecca is furious with her family and decides to take Tanja's job offer in New York City, which she made to get Rebecca out of the way. But before Rebecca leaves, she decides to get revenge. After she saves herself a luxurious life in the states in promising each board member, accept for Helena and Hagen, her vote, Tanja is about to burn her once again. But Rebecca gets the upper hand, locking Tanja into the ice cellar of Königsbrunn. Tanja is soon confronted with her old trauma, hallucinating about her dead father Walter. When Sebastian finds her, he and Tanja seem closer than ever and for the first time Sebastian realizes how much he cares about Tanja. But shortly after, he gets Tanja's anger when he leaves her alone after promising otherwise. Tanja swears to him that he will regret that and is later confronted with seeing Tanja buying a gun. Sebastian has no idea that Tanja is hallucinating about her father and is sure that Tanja wants to kill him. He asks Ludwig for help as Sebastian gets the idea that Tanja isn't her old self anymore. When Sebastian is about to confront her, Tanja sees Walter instead of Sebastian and shoots him. Sebastian gets away by a graze and Tanja is shocked when she realizes who she shoot. While Ludwig wants to commit Tanja into psychiatric care, Sebastian first wants to know what is wrong with his fiancée. Tanja later tells Sebastian the story about her abusing father and the tragic death of her little brother. Sebastian is shocked and promises Tanja that he will never leave her alone again.

Marriage to Sebastian; Dangerous past
It seems like Tanja has finally found fulfilled happiness; something she never expected. But when Tanja finds out that Ludwig recorded her shooting Sebastian and he knew about Ludwig's plan to eventually blackmail her with the tapes, Tanja breaks things off with Sebastian. He tries to explain that he wanted to destroy the recording, but Tanja has lost her trust in him. She decides to take a vacation and leaves for Paris. Tanja then plans a photo shooting for her new campaign in Palma de Mallorca. Oliver Sabel, who's the male model of the campaign, tries to prevent the photo shooting from happing as he knows that Tanja's enemy Clarissa is still alive and after ten years of prison, now lives on the Spanish island to reconnect with her children Jan and Julia, who live there as well. Olli can't prevent the photo shooting from happing, but at least Tanja doesn't find out about Clarissa being alive. The other way around, Clarissa is shocked as she sees Tanja from a distance; believing that Tanja died in that plane crash in 2001.
Back in Düsseldorf, Tanja wants Sebastian to sign some papers with whom he would play no role in his child's life. Sebastian is shocked about Tanja's plans to leave town and start a new life in New York. Sure that Tanja's feelings for him will eventually get the upper hand, Sebastian signs the papers as prove of his love for her. In the next couple of weeks, Sebastian tries everything to win Tanja back. But she's too afraid of being hurt again and even after Sebastian and Tanja witness an ultrasound of their baby's heartbeat and find out that they will have a daughter; Tanja moves on with her plans to go to New York. Sebastian realizes that he lost her and tells Tanja that he's done trying to win her back. When she already packed her things for New York and is about to leave, Tanja realizes that she has to risk something for love and finally returns into Sebastian's arms. The two want to get married as soon as possible, but as another scandal has hit the Lahnstein family the couple decide to have a small wedding with just the two of them.
Tanja and Sebastian want to get married on Mallorca, which leads to Olli warning Charlie, who's visiting Clarissa. While Charlie tries to get Clarissa to spend a few days on a spa with her in Madrid, Sebastian and Tanja give their religious confessions to a priest to get married. Tanja is shocked as the priest turns out to be her former lover Jan. Reminding Tanja about their past, Jan doesn't want to marry the couple as he doesn't believe that Tanja could ever really love somebody. Tanja then proves Jan wrong as she finally confesses her love to Sebastian for the very first – and in her words the only – time. After seeing that Tanja and Sebastian really love each other, Jan agrees to marry the couple. They then have another problem as they need witnesses to a marriage in Spain. Realizing that Charlie is in Palma, apparently visiting Julia, Tanja is asking her to be her Matron of honor. Charlie as a laugh but then agrees as she wants Tanja to leave the island as soon as possible. For the very same reason, Julia is in on the wedding too as Sebastian's "best man". 
Sebastian notices some tension between Julia and Tanja and asks his bride about their past. Tanja is confessing – for the first time ever – that Julia was once married to a man named Tim Sander, who later had a girlfriend named Cleo Winter. She tells him that she did something horrible to Cleo and that Tim, with the help of Clarissa, ended up kidnapping her and held her hostage for three years in the basement. Sebastian is horrified for Tanja as she lets him know that she murdered Tim as soon as she could free herself. Sebastian is shocked and Tanja even lets him know that it's okay if he can't marry her anymore. But Sebastian tells Tanja that he loves her and that all that is in the past. 
In the meantime, Clarissa found out that Tanja is back and wants to get married on Mallorca. To stop her mother, Julia sees no other way but to lock Clarissa up in her room. Anyway, Clarissa makes it to the wedding in time, but hides out and witnesses how Tanja and Sebastian exchange their "I dos". Tanja and Sebastian leave the island happily married as Clarissa makes plans to how get her company back out of Tanja's hands.

Mother of Incest; Facing Tim's son
Back in Düsseldorf, Tanja is prepared to make the first line of Ligne Clarisse Lahnstein a success. But then Tanja has to face legal trouble by a Christian consortium, who wants to ban her Incest campaign from the US market. She flies overseas to take care of things, while she authorizes Sebastian to hire a new designer for Ligne CL. When Tanja returns she meets Sonja Jäger, who not only is her new designer but also an old friend of Sebastian. Sonja seems to get Tanja's version for the company and the two of them work 24/7 to make the company a success. But with the backslash from her trial in New York, Tanja needs more money for advertising and expensive fabrics. Surprisingly, Ansgar is offering to invest in the fashion company, if Tanja allows him to choose a co-head for Ligne CL. Tanja has no other choice as to take Ansgar's deal, believing that he will offer his sister Nico or his daughter Kim the position. Ansgar stays very secretive of his new employee, while Tanja's getting ready for the fashion show. She's shocked when she receives a call from someone asking about Tim Sander. Tanja is scared that her past is catching up with her but after another call, which implies that the caller was just asking about Tim for some reunion, Tanja is relieved and gets excited for the company's big day. She presents her campaign "Mother of Incest" and even commemorates Clarissa in front of the press. When the wedding dress appears on stage, Tanja gets the shock of her life when she sees no other than Clarissa in that dress. Tanja tries to stay calm, while Ansgar announces that Clarissa would join Tanja as co-head of the company. Sebastian tries to talk to Tanja and even wants her to quit, when Tanja realizes that her husband still doesn't seem to know that she can't exist without fighting – which Clarissa does know. When Tanja and Clarissa have their first private conversation in years, Clarissa offers a gun to Tanja to finish what she started ten years ago. Tanja doesn't give in and Clarissa admits later to Ansgar that Tanja's flame has burned out. In the meanwhile, Timo Mendes, the son of Julia and Tim, found out that Tanja is responsible for his father's death and arrives in Düsseldorf to confront her. After he sees Tanja together with her daughter Emma and Sebastian, he realizes that she isn't the devil he expected. But after finding out more information about how caring his father was and how he wanted to have a place in his son's life, he confronts Tanja with the murder she committed.

Verbotene Liebe – Next Generation
Five years after her ex-husband Ansgar got arrested for the suspicion of murder, the Lahnstein empire is crushed. Even the family's home, Königsbrunn Castle, is now owned by the Verhovens, a fashion dynasty who also acquired LCL with the help of Clarissa. Tanja vanished with all of Ansgar's money. Separated from her husband Sebastian, Tanja leads a life in the background. After Clarissa is killed in helicopter crash, Ansgar wants to find out who is behind Clarissa's murder. He originally believes that Robert Verhoven (Heinz Hoenig) wanted his business partner dead and could possible be responsible. But a private detective, hired by Ansgar, later finds out that the true culprit is a blonde woman. Tanja later appears and pays Clarissa's former assistant Juri Kasky (Jannik Scharmweber) for his role in her enemy's death. As Ansgar takes over as acting CEO of Verhoven, Tanja appears and wants to work with Ansgar to get everything back the Lahnsteins lost.

Crimes committed
 Convicted but not guilty of involuntary manslaughter of Thomas Wittkamp.
 Faked a pregnancy to become the wife of Henning von Anstetten.
 Murdered her former son-in-law and second husband Rajan Rai to get the hereditary from his father – and Tanja's first husband – Ben von Anstetten.
 Kidnapped Clarissa von Anstetten.
 Murdered Cleo Winter, after she was able to prove Tanja's involvement in Clarissa's kidnapping and murdered her associate.
 Murdered Tim Sander after he locked her up for three years for murdering Cleo.
 Faked a DNA-test to prove people wrong that Martin von Beyenbach and Henning von Anstetten are father and son.
 Attempted murder of Henning von Anstetten and framing Clarissa von Anstetten for the act.
 Attempted murder of Lukas Roloff and Beatrice von Beyenbach.
 Framed Clarissa von Anstetten for the possession of drugs and got her arrested.
 Attempted murder of Charlie Schneider for telling stories about her past.
 Threatened to murder Charlie Schneider several times.
 Murdered Donald Rush, after he tried to kill her.
 Framed Bernd von Beyenbach for Donald Rush's murder.
 Attempted murder of Hagen Berg in a car explosion.
 Murdered a salesman for exotic snakes.
 Faked the death of her son Hannes and her own death.
 Postured an attack on Lydia Brandner.
 Provided Sarah Hofmann with cocaine.
 Set up the attempted murder of Sarah Hofmann, when she provided her with strychnine instead of pure cocaine.
 Threatened to murder Nathalie von Lahnstein.
 Set up the attempted murder of Kitty Kübler and framed Nathalie von Lahnstein.
 Set up the kidnapping of her mother Annegret Wittkamp by Ulla Müller.
 Wrecked her mother Annegret Wittkamp which made her kill herself.
 Several other blackmails and illegal business activities.
 Attempted murder of Maria di Balbi. Poisoned her and tried to make it look like suicide. Ansgar found and rescued her.
 Blackmailed Ansgar von Lahnstein several times.
 Made an attempt upon the life of Lydia's unborn child.
 Framed Rebecca von Lahnstein for forged designs.
 Shot Sebastian von Lahnstein by accident; while hallucinating about her dead father.
 Assassination of Clarissa von Anstetten.

See also
Lahnstein family

References

Verbotene Liebe characters
Television characters introduced in 1995
Fictional business executives
Fictional counts and countesses
Fictional murderers
Fictional people in fashion
Fictional socialites